WRDS-LP (104.3 FM) is a southern gospel radio station licensed to Roscommon, Michigan, United States.  The station is currently owned by Soul's Harbor Assembly of God Church.

References

External links
 

RDS-LP
Radio stations established in 2003
2003 establishments in Michigan
Southern Gospel radio stations in the United States
RDS-LP